The University of Minnesota Messenia Expedition (UMME) was an archaeological expedition in Messenia, Greece conducted between 1953 and 1975. It was devised and begun by William McDonald, who also served as its director for most of its duration.

Initially conducted as an archaeological survey of Mycenaean sites in the region of the Palace of Nestor at Pylos, the project expanded over its duration to survey  of territory, gathering records of habitation from the Neolithic to the Medieval periods. Between 1969 and 1975, the expedition carried out the excavation of Nichoria, a Mycenaean and Early Iron Age site in southern Messenia, which proved a significant source of information about the end of the Bronze Age in Greece, as well as a proving ground and case study for the use of scientific, multi-disciplinary methods in archaeological excavation.

The UMME's work established Messenia as one of the best-studied regions of Mycenaean Greece, and has been cited as an inspiration for numerous other archaeological projects in Greece.

Background and rationale

In a later reflection on the project, McDonald stated that the inspiration for the Minnesota Messenia Expedition came in 1953. Carl Blegen had resumed excavations at the Palace of Nestor at Pylos in 1952, having commenced them in the spring of 1939, only to be interrupted by the outbreak of the Second World War. In 1953, Michael Ventris and John Chadwick completed the decipherment of Linear B: Ventris had written to Blegen on 19 May offering a transcription of the Linear B tablet PY Ta 641, which served as near-conclusive proof that the decipherment was correct, that Linear B encoded a form of Greek, and that Ventris and Chadwick's discoveries could be used to read the archive of Linear B tablets that Blegen, with McDonald's assistance, had begun to unearth at Pylos - a corpus that began with 566 tablets, found in 621 fragments. The Pylos tablets revealed a large number of toponyms, and gave hints as to the political organisation of the Mycenaean state centred on Pylos — in particular, its organisation into a 'Hither Province' and a 'Further Province'.

Blegen, Chadwick and other scholars saw the need for a greater understanding of the Mycenaean-era sites and settlements of Messenia, in order to match the toponyms listed in the Linear B tablets with the sites to which they related. While some field survey work had been carried out in Messenia during the first half of the 20th century, the number of known sites was comparatively low, and the quality of survey variable across different parts of the region. Other small-scale surveys had taken place in the 1930s and 1940s, principally two investigations by Jerome Sperling and Ernst Meyer in the north of Messenia, while Blegen had surveyed the region around the Bay of Navarino in early 1939, but there was little understanding of the distribution of settlements between these disconnected areas. At Blegen's suggestion, McDonald therefore planned to survey widely in Messenia, hoping in particular to identify 'towns' contemporary with the Linear B tablets.

John Cherry would later chart another line of inspiration for the UMME in McDonald's interest in the historicity of the Homeric epics, pointing to McDonald's 1942 article 'Where Did Nestor Live?', which attempted to use evidence from the Iliad and Odyssey to argue for the site of Ano Englianos (now known as the 'Palace of Nestor') as the home of Homer's Nestor. Indeed, McDonald's later collaborator, Richard Hope Simpson, would publish several works in the same methodological vein, including his Ph.D. thesis and his co-authored 1970 volume The Catalogue of Ships in Homer's Iliad, both of which attempted to find the archaeological analogues of the toponyms used in the so-called 'Catalogue of Ships' in the second book of the Iliad, and the publication of the UMME's findings would include the Trojan War as an historical event on its chronological chart.

The survey project (1953–1968)

McDonald's first surveys (1953–1959)

In the earliest surveys, the main approach was to identify toponyms in Classical writers, particularly Homer, Strabo and Pausanias, and to attempt to cross–reference the descriptions of the places given in the ancient sources with the most likely sites for ancient settlement, given the surveyors' interpretation of the modern topography. McDonald and his collaborators largely looked for material dated to the LH IIIB period, contemporary with the destruction of the palace at Pylos and the Linear B tablets discovered there.

McDonald's first surveys took place over two weeks in 1953, covering an area  in radius around the site of the Palace of Nestor, accompanied by Charalambos Christophilopoulos, a Messenian who had studied archaeology under Konstantinos Kourouniotis, the excavator of the Temple of Apollo at Bassae and the sanctuary of Demeter at Eleusis. He returned for four months in 1955, surveying the coastal region between Kyparissia and Methoni alongside Dionysios Androutsakis, the foreman of Blegen's excavations at Pylos. Finally, McDonald's receipt of a Guggenheim Fellowship for 1958–1959 allowed him to undertake a further series of expeditions with Androutsakis during 1958, from Korone to the Alfeios river.

In the spring of 1959, McDonald was joined by Richard Hope Simpson, with whom he developed the surveying methods that would characterise the project over its duration. The survey's approach would later be referred to as 'the Hope Simpson method', a label which McDonald resisted, writing in retrospect that "field strategies were not imposed by one collaborator but were gradually evolved by joint experience and discussion". Many of the defining characteristics of the UMME had their origins in this period, such as its diachronic perspective and efforts to recover evidence of habitation across the widest possible historical range: this was represented in 1959 by the presence of Peter Topping, director of the Gennadeion Library in Athens, who was researching the medieval habitation of the region. The later project's interdisciplinary nature was also foreshadowed by the two weeks in which Diomedes Charalambous, a geologist from the University of Athens, took part in the expedition, using an auger to uncover evidence of coastline changes since the Bronze Age. While these expeditions did not formally take place under the UMME name, McDonald and Hope Simpson would later include them under that label in their retrospective assessments of the development of the project.

McDonald and Hope Simpson undertook a final, short expedition in July 1960, checking the results of their survey with the assistance of Hope Simpson's frequent collaborator , before publishing their initial findings in the American Journal of Archaeology.

The University of Minnesota Messenia Expedition (1961–1968)

The UMME name was first formally used for the expedition from the 1961 season onwards. McDonald and Hope Simpson were joined on this expedition by three members of the University of Minnesota faculty: Jesse Fant, a civil engineer; Herbert E. Wright, a geologist; and Fred Lukermann, a geographer.

The methods of the survey expanded to reflect its increasingly interdisciplinary nature. The project secured the assistance of the Royal Hellenic Air Force to create aerial photographs of the region of Messenia, which were then interpreted by Fant (and later William Loy) to identify potential ancient sites: McDonald and Hope Simpson later estimated that this allowed them to reduce their false positive rate for site identification below 50%, in contrast to over 90% from surface survey alone. While Hope Simpson and McDonald focused on the surface pottery, Fant surveyed for ancient roads while Wright attempted to reconstruct the paleotopography of the region. In total, the 1961 season uncovered around 150 probable Mycenaean sites.

The expedition returned to Messenia between March 25 and July 21, 1963, with the additional participation of the botanist Willem van Zeist; John Lazenby and his brother Stephen, an officer in the Royal Navy; Demetrios Christodoulou of the UN Food and Agriculture Organization; the ceramics specialist Frederick R. Matson; and Eskil Broburg, a graduate student at the University of Minnesota who served as the expedition's photographer.

As the project progressed, its scale and disciplinary range increased, inspired by contemporary projects in the Middle East (particularly the 'Prehistoric Project', which surveyed in Iraq, Iran and Turkey, led by Robert Braidwood and Bruce Howe, and Robert McCormick Adams' Diyala Basin Archaeological Project), and in the New World (particularly the Teotihuacan Valley Project under William T. Sanders). In 1964, Lukermann carried out investigations into the ancient population distribution, while Matson and Hope Simpson carried out anthropological investigations of contemporary ceramics manufacture on the island of Sifnos. Hope Simpson led the field survey between 1964 and 1968, also serving as acting director of the project from 1966–1968 as a result of McDonald's illness. He was assisted throughout by Fant; in 1964 by Lazenby; in 1965 by Roger Howell, a student at the British School at Athens; in 1967 by McDonald and in 1968 by two graduate students,  and Nancy Spencer. William Loy, then Luckermann's Ph.D. student, joined the project as a geographer and cartographer in 1965, assisting Hope Simpson with the 1966 field survey.

Reviewing the work in the American Journal of Archaeology,  credited it, along with Blegen's volumes from the Pylos excavations, as having established Messenia as 'the best-documented region of prehistoric Greece', an estimation echoed by Sterling Dow. In total, the project found 215 prehistoric sites and a further 98 inhabited between the Classical and medieval periods. The project estimated the overall population of Mycenaean Messenia at around 50,000, a figure McDonald reaffirmed in 1979 article, co-written with Joan Carothers.

The excavation of Nichoria (1969–1975)

McDonald saw the excavation of Nichoria as the second phase of the Minnesota expedition, and as an opportunity to test in detail the large-scale hypotheses generated by the survey project. During the UMME survey, the site was suggested by John Chadwick as a possible location for the settlement known in the Linear B as ti-mi-to-a-ke-e: the capital of Pylos' 'Further Province' and an important site for the flax industry, as well as the region's coastal defence.

McDonald first identified the prehistoric site of Nichoria in October 1958, and conducted test excavations there in 1959 with Nicholas Yalouris, ephor of the Western Peloponnese for the Greek Archaeological Service, to assess the suitability of the site for a full-scale excavation. Approximately , or 9.2%, of the site was excavated in total. After an initial eight-week season in 1969, focusing on test excavations in seven areas of the site, work in 1970–1971 focused on the areas labelled in 1969 as I–IV, uncovering the remains of a tholos tomb (since known to scholarship as the 'MME' tholos) and evidence of habitation from the Early Helladic period into the Early Iron Age.

The excavators found evidence of the abandonment of the site around 750 BCE, and suggested that this may have been a consequence of the defeat of the Messenians by the Spartans in the First Messenian War.

The excavation of Nichoria was particularly notable for its use of the scientific approaches of the 'New Archaeology' (now generally known as 'processual archaeology') developed in the 1960s. The excavators experimented with the use of photogrammetry to produce maps of the site, and employed both dry sieving and wet sieving, then unusual in Classical archaeology, to process soil samples, allowing the recovery of small fragments of artefacts as well as archaeobotanical and zooarchaeological remains. Attempts were also made to carbon-date some of the remains, which helped to indicate some of the limitations of the use of this technique in the Aegean region.

Notable participants

 William McDonald (1953–1975, field director)
 Richard Hope Simpson (1959–1975, acting field director 1966–1968)
 George Rapp (1966–1975, assistant director)
 Herbert E. Wright (1962–1968)
 Willem van Zeist (1963–1968)
 John Chadwick (assisted with analysis throughout, and in the field briefly in 1968.)
 Cynthia Shelmerdine (excavated at Nichoria 1972–1975)
 Nancy Wilkie (1968–1975)
 Sterling Dow (1963)

Legacy

John Cherry described the UMME as a "watershed" in the understanding of Bronze-Age Greece. It has been described as "the first truly multidisciplinary archaeological expedition in Greece", and credited with "kick-starting" the practice of regional studies in that country. In particular, it has been cited as an inspiration for later surveys, such as the Southern Argolid Survey and the Berbati Valley Project, which often adopted a more intensive survey methodology while maintaining the UMME's interdisciplinary, diachronic approach. In particular, the Pylos Regional Archaeological Project, which began in 1990, aimed to build on the material collected by the UMME; its director, Jack Davis, later cited the 1972 'Mycenaean Geography' conference at the University of Cambridge, centred on the results of the UMME, as the source of his interest in Messenia.

The survey expeditions significantly expanded the corpus of known Mycenaean sites, particularly those outside palatial centres like Mycenae, Tiryns and Pylos, few of which had previously been excavated. The surveys carried out directly by the UMME were complemented by contemporary work by Spyridon Marinatos, who largely focused on funerary sites, and Natan Valmin, who surveyed and excavated in the region of Malthi. By the completion of the UMME survey, more tholos tombs were known in Messenia than had been known in all of Greece before 1940. The UMME's approach was later criticised for its reliance on aerial photography and the investigators' intuition to identify areas for survey, which led to uneven coverage and a tendency to miss smaller sites, particularly those whose location did not conform to the surveyors' expectations, but also described as "a prodigious influence on the development of archaeology in Greece", which "permitted for the first time the systematic examination of Mycenaean geography."

The UMME observed a large amount of continuity in site use and habitation after the end of the Mycenaean period, providing evidence against the totality of the Late Bronze Age collapse and weighing, in McDonald and Hope Simpson's judgement, against the then-popular theories of a 'Dorian Invasion' or a widespread uprising against palatial rule. The excavations at Nichoria, in particular, have been described as "fundamental" for the understanding of the transition between the Bronze Age and Iron Age in Greece, as well as for the development of the Greek polis.

The animal bones from Nichoria

The project's interest in zooarchaeology and the recovery of animal bones made Nichoria into an important site for the diets of people in Mycenaean and Iron Age Greece. Initial examination by Robert Sloan and Maria Duncan suggested that the primary meat consumed at Nichoria during the Mycenaean period came from goats, followed by sheep, pigs and cattle. This provided a contrast with the proportion of animals mentioned in the Linear B tablets, where cattle and sheep predominated — a difference which may have reflected the greater interest of palace-based scribes in these animals, which had more direct economic importance to the palace. Sloan and Duncan also observed a significant increase in the proportion of cattle bones in the Early Iron Age, accounting for around 35% of the animals recorded versus 20% in the Mycenaean period, which they connected with a shift towards the use of cattle for meat, rather than for milk. Anthony Snodgrass used the results from Nichoria to argue for a 'pastoral hypothesis' to explain the apparent drop in observed settlement numbers throughout Greece between the Late Bronze Age and Early Iron Age, in which large, permanent, archaeologically-visible settlements were abandoned in favour of transient pastoralism. However, later studies by Elizabeth Mancz and Flint Dibble questioned the underlying data, suggesting that the apparent increase in the ratio of cattle bones is best explained by taphonomic processes, specifically chemical and attritional weathering, which had a disproportionate effect on later chronological layers (which lay closer to the surface) and the smaller bones of goats and sheep, and so artificially inflated the apparent proportion of cattle in the Early Iron Age samples vis-à-vis those from the Bronze Age.

Footnotes

Explanatory Notes

References

Bibliography

Publications of the UMME

Other works cited

 
 
 
 
 
 
 
 
 
 
 
 
 
 
 
 
 
 
 
 
 
 
 
 
  
 
 
 
 
 

 
 
 
 
 
 
 
 
 
 

Archaeology of Greece
Archaeological projects
Archaeological expeditions
Messenia